Kurt Erik Nilsen (born 29 September 1978) is a Norwegian pop/country singer. He won the first season of the Norwegian reality show Idol, which aired on TV 2 in May 2003. He then won a one-off international version of Pop Idol called World Idol on 1 January 2004, featuring winners of the various national Idol shows.

Career

Idol
Upon leaving school, Nilsen made his living as a plumber. Nilsen became the lead singer in the Norwegian band Fenrik Lane. He is a left-handed musician and plays his guitar with the strings upside down. He appeared on and won Norwegian Idol with 54% of the votes against Gaute Ormåsen. He is one of only seven contestants in the Norwegian Idol history who succeeded in staying out of "bottom three/two" places in weekly votes.

His subsequent single, "She's So High", written by Tal Bachman, went straight to number one in the Norwegian VG-lista singles chart and is among the biggest-selling singles in Norway to date. His debut album was simply called I.

World Idol
He subsequently won the title for the World Idol on 1 January 2004, singing the hit "Beautiful Day" by U2, beating competitors from ten other nations, including the more famous Idol winners, Britain's Will Young, and favourite Kelly Clarkson of the United States, and scoring the first place in 10 out of 11 countries eligible to vote for him (Norwegian voters being unable to vote for him).

In the show presenting the entries on 25 December, Ian Dickson, the Australian (English ex-pat) judge, said: "Kurt, you are a hell of a marketing challenge, because you have the voice of an angel, but you look like a Hobbit."  The comment made Nilsen laugh out loud.

Post-Idol career
His second CD, A Part of Me, released in 2004, contains only his own material.

Nilsen performed the duet, "It's All Coming Back to Me Now", alongside Norwegian Pop/Alternative Rocker, Marion Raven at the One Call Event. Taking the place of Meat Loaf, with whom Raven recorded the track for the album Bat Out of Hell III 

In 2006, he and three other Norwegian artists Askil Holm, Espen Lind and Alejandro Fuentes, all in the same management, joined forces and went on tour in March as what was known by the media as "The New Guitar Buddies".

Initially, they planned a short tour (five to six concerts), but ended up playing for more than 100,000 people during their tour of around 30 concerts. Although they had not planned to, they subsequently released a live album from that tour.

Nilsen performed the duet "When You're Gone" alongside English pop singer, and former-Spice Girls member, Melanie C at the Top 20 event at Rådhusplassen in Oslo, Norway in the summer of 2007.

In 2008, in connection with his latest and country flavoured album Rise to the Occasion Kurt teamed up with American music legend Willie Nelson to perform the old country music standard "Lost Highway". The song was an instant hit in his native Norway and helped him top both the single chart, the album chart and the radio chart all at once.

In 2009, "The New Guitar Buddies" was back with a new tour and a new album, including one concert on 9 May 2009 at Rockefeller Oslo.

Spring 2010 saw Kurt touring Norway with an acoustic concert tour in intimate concert halls. His guest artist was Elin Gaustad, who was a competitor in Norway's first X Factor show in 2009. In late February 2010, Kurt and Elin sang the duet "The Water is Wide" on the TV2 show Senkveld, to great acclaim.

In 2010, Kurt recorded a Christmas song album entitled Have Yourself a Merry Little Christmas with the Kringkastingsorkester (KORK), the Norwegian Radio Orchestra. It was released on 15 November 2010 in Norway. He performs with this orchestra and some guest artists at Lillestrøm messecenter, near Oslo on 18 December 2010. It was broadcast live on NRK television. The album stayed at the top of the Norwegian Albums Chart for 5 consecutive weeks (48/2010 to 52/2010)

2011 saw Kurt going on the road on a new tour in addition to playing at a number of music festivals and venues.

On 15 September 2012, it was announced on the official Norwegian Idol website that Kurt will be the second of an all-new four-member jury of former Idol contestants to celebrate 10 years since the debut of Idol in Norway. Another judge joining in was season three runner-up Tone Damli Aaberge.

Personal life

In January 2005, Nilsen broke up with his fiancée, Kristine Jacobsen. They had been together for 11 years and had two children together: Marte (born 1996) and Erik (born 2000). In January 2006, Kurt's new girlfriend Kristin gave birth to her first and Nilsen's third child, Lucas. They married later that year, then separated in May 2013.

Nilsen has received national attention for his guitar-shaped alpine hut, in the Hardangervidda in Norway.

Discography
The following is a discography of albums and singles released by Norwegian music artist Kurt Nilsen.

Studio albums

Live albums

Singles

Other releases
1998 Shoe (with former band Breed; later Fenrik Lane)
2002 Come Down Here (EP) (Norwegian album charts: #2) (with Fenrik Lane)
2003 Idol '03 (Norwegian album charts: #1)
2011 Mitt lille land, with other artists

See also
World Idol

References

External links
 .
 
 
 

1978 births
Living people
Idols (TV series) winners
Idol (Norwegian TV series) participants
Norwegian pop singers
Norwegian songwriters
Musicians from Bergen
Norwegian multi-instrumentalists
RCA Records artists
19 Recordings artists
21st-century Norwegian singers
21st-century Norwegian male singers